Uppland Runic Inscription 701 or U 701, and also known as Kynge stone, is a runestone that is now lost. It was recorded in a drawing in the 17th century by Johan Hadorph and P. Helgonius, as well as Johannes Haquini Rhezelius. Richard Dybeck took up the search for the missing U 701 in 1860 but was not able to find it. It is believed that U 701 was carved by the artist who made runic inscriptions U 700 and U 702. The recorded text ends with a prayer that uses the Norse word salu for soul, which was imported from English and first used on a different inscription during the tenth century.

Transliteration of runic text into Latin letters
[kuti : lit : risa st... þinsa : iftiʀ : i-ialt : bruþur : sin : kuþ × ialibi salu : hans *]

See also
Joint Nordic database for runic inscriptions
Runic alphabet

References

Uppland Runic Inscription 0701